The 1985–86 Israel State Cup (Gvia HaMedina) was the 47th season of Israel's nationwide football cup competition and the 32nd after the Israeli Declaration of Independence.

The competition was won by Beitar Jerusalem who have beaten Shimshon Tel Aviv 2–1 in the final.

Results

Round of 16

Quarter-finals

Semi-finals

Final

References
100 Years of Football 1906-2006, Elisha Shohat (Israel), 2006, pp. 268

Israel State Cup
State Cup
Israel State Cup seasons